Hans Vogt was a footballer who played for FC Basel. He played in the position of midfielder.

In the Basel season 1923–24 Hans Vogt played three games for FC Basel. Two of these games were in the Swiss Serie A and the other was a friendly game. He played his domestic league debut for the club in the away game on 3 February 1924 as Basel won 1–0 against Biel-Bienne.

References

Sources
 Rotblau: Jahrbuch Saison 2017/2018. Publisher: FC Basel Marketing AG. 
 Die ersten 125 Jahre. Publisher: Josef Zindel im Friedrich Reinhardt Verlag, Basel. 
 Verein "Basler Fussballarchiv" Homepage

FC Basel players
Association football midfielders
Swiss men's footballers